Rangeview is an unincorporated community within the Rural Municipality of Reno No. 51, Saskatchewan, Canada.  The former town-site is located 5 km west of Highway 18, about 15 km south of the community of Robsart and Highway 13.

Education

Rangeview no longer has a school. Those who live in Rangeview and area are sent to the neighbouring village of Consul which has a Kindergarten to Grade 12 school serving approximately 100 students.

See also
 List of communities in Saskatchewan

References

Reno No. 51, Saskatchewan
Unincorporated communities in Saskatchewan
Populated places established in 1910
Ghost towns in Saskatchewan
Division No. 4, Saskatchewan